The Whitfield railway line was a  narrow gauge railway located in north-eastern Victoria, Australia, branching from the main North East railway at Wangaratta to the terminus of Whitfield.

Overview 
It was the first of four narrow gauge lines in Victoria. It was unlike the other lines in that it was built through mostly flat, open, agricultural country, following the King River.  The  line was built as a narrow gauge one because it was thought that it might be extended into the mountainous country to the south, but that never happened. One of the proposed extensions was to Tolmie.

The line was opened in March 1899, and was the first of the narrow gauge lines to close, in October 1953. It relied mostly on local agricultural traffic, and opened with a daily mixed train. By the 1930s, that had been reduced to a weekly goods service, and stayed at that level until the railway closed. There was only one lineside industry, a dairy at Moyhu, and the majority of stations were nameboards at road crossings.

Whitfield to Wangaratta Rail Heritage Trail 
The Whitfield to Wangaratta Rail Heritage Trail follows the railway but is an on-road trail, it is not on the actual former railway.

See also 

 Narrow gauge lines of the Victorian Railways

References 

Closed regional railway lines in Victoria (Australia)
2 ft 6 in gauge railways in Australia